Easter Island was traditionally ruled by a monarchy, with a king as its leader.

First paramount chief 
The legendary, first chief of Easter Island is said to have been Hotu Matuꞌa, whose arrival has been dated in the 4th, 6th or 9th century AD. Legend insists that this man was the chief of a tribe that lived on Marae Renga. The Marae Renga is said to have existed in a place known as the "Hiva region". Some books suggest that the Hiva region was an area in the Marquesas Islands, but today, it is believed that the ancestral land of the Easter Islanders would have been located in the Pitcairn Mangareva intercultural zone. Some versions of the story claim that internal conflicts drove Hotu Matuꞌa to sail with his tribe for new land, while others say a natural disaster (possibly a tidal wave) caused the tribe to flee.

Despite these differences, the stories do agree on the next part: A priest named Haumaka appeared to Hotu Matuꞌa in his dreams one night. The priest flew out to sea and discovered an island, which he called Te Pito ꞌo te Kāinga ("The Center of the Earth"). Sending seven scouts, Hotu Matuꞌa embraced his dream and awaited the return of his scouts. After eating, planting yams, and resting, the seven scouts returned home to tell of the good news. Hotu Matuꞌa took a large crew, his family, and everything they needed to survive in the new land. Then, they rowed a single huge, double-hulled canoe to "The Center of the Earth" and landed at Anakena, Rapa Nui (Easter Island).

Tuꞌu ko Iho 

According to Steven Roger Fischer's Island at the End of the World, a certain individual named Tuꞌu ko Iho co-founded the settlement on the island. Fischer's book claims he not only did this, but a legend says he "brought the statues to the island and caused them to walk".

Children of Hotu Matuꞌa 

Shortly before the death of Hotu Matuꞌa, the island was given to his children, who formed eight main clans. In addition, four smaller and less important clans were formed.

Tuꞌu Maheke: the firstborn son of Hotu. He received the lands between Anakena and Maunga Tea-Tea.
Miru: received the lands between Anakena and Hanga Roa.
Marama: received the lands between Anakena and Rano Raraku. Having access to the Rano Raraku quarry proved extremely useful for those living in Marama's lands. The quarry soon became the island's main source of tuff used in the construction of the moai (large stone statues). In fact, 95% of the moai were made in Rano Raraku.
Raa settled to the northwest of Maunga Tea-Tea.
Koro Orongo made a settlement between Akahanga and Rano Raraku.
Hotu Iti was given the whole eastern part of the island.
 and 8. Tupahotu and Ngaure were left with the remaining parts of the island.

Royal patterns throughout Easter Island 

Over the years, the clans slowly grouped together into two territories. The Ko Tuꞌu Aro were composed of clans in the northwest, while the Hotu Iti were mainly living in the southeast part of the island. The Miru are very commonly seen as the true royal heirs who ruled the Ko Tuꞌu Aro clans.

Since then, leaders of Easter Island have been hereditary rulers who claimed divine origin and separated themselves from the rest of the islanders with taboos. These ariki not only controlled religious functions in the clan, but also ran everything else, from managing food supplies to waging war. Ever since Easter Island was divided into two super-clans, the rulers of Easter Island followed a predictable pattern. The people of Rapa Nui were especially competitive during those times. They usually competed to build a bigger moai than their neighbors, but when this failed to resolve the conflict, the tribes often turned to war and throwing down each other's statues.

Lists of the paramount chiefs and historical kings of Easter Island 

1. Hotu (A Matua), son of Matua (c. 400)
2. Vakai, his wife
3. Tuu ma Heke
4. Nuku (Inukura?)
5. Miru a Tumaheke
6. Hata a Miru
7. Miru o Hata
8. Hiuariru (Hiu a Miru?)
9. Aturaugi. The first obsidian spearheads were used.
10. Raa
11. Atahega a Miru (descendant of Miru?), around 600
    ......Hakapuna?
17. Ihu an Aturanga (Oihu?)
    ......Ruhoi?
20. Tuu Ka(u)nga te Mamaru
21. Takahita
22. Ouaraa, around 800
23. Koroharua
24. Mahuta Ariiki (the first stone images were made in his son's time)
25. Atua Ure Rangi
26. Atuamata
27. Uremata
28. Te Riri Tuu Kura
29. Korua Rongo
30. Tiki Te Hatu
31. Tiki Tena
32. Uru Kenu, around 1000
33. Te Rurua Tiki Te Hatu
34. Nau Ta Mahiki
35. Te Rika Tea
36. Te Teratera
37. Te Ria Kautahito (Hirakau-Tehito?)
38. Ko Te Pu I Te Toki
39. Kuratahogo
40. Ko Te Hiti Rua Nea
41. Te Uruaki Kena
42. Tu Te Rei Manana, around 1200
43. Ko Te Kura Tahonga
44. Taoraha Kaihahanga
45. Tukuma(kuma)
46. Te Kahui Tuhunga
47. Te Tuhunga Hanui
48. Te Tuhunga Haroa
49. Te Tuhunga "Mare Kapeau"
50. Toati Rangi Hahe
51. Tangaroa Tatarara (Maybe Tangaiia of Mangaia Island ?)
52. Havini(vini) Koro (or Hariui Koro), about 1400
53. Puna Hako
54. Puna Ate Tuu
55. Puna Kai Te Vana
56. Te Riri Katea (? – 1485)
57. N/A
58. N/A
59. Haumoana, Tarataki and Tupa Ariki (from Peru), from 1485
60. Mahaki Tapu Vae Iti (Mahiki Tapuakiti)
61. Ngau-ka Te Mahaki or Tuu Koiho (Ko-Tuu-ihu?)
62. Anakena
63. Hanga Rau
64. Marama Ariki, around 1600
65. Riu Tupa Hotu (Nui Tupa Hotu?)
66. Toko Te Rangi (Perhaps the "God" Rongo of Mangaia Island?)
67. Kao Aroaro (Re Kauu?)
68. Mataivi
69. Kao Hoto
70. Te Ravarava (Terava Rara)
71. Tehitehuke
72. Te Rahai or Terahai
(The alternative rulers after Terahai: Koroharua, Riki-ka-atea, whose son was Hotu Matua, then Kaimakoi, Tehetu-tara-Kura, Huero, Kaimakoi (or Raimokaky), finally Gaara who is Ngaara on the main list below.)
73. Te Huke
74. Tuu, from Mata Nui (Ko Tuu?), around 1770
75. Hotu Iti (born from Mata Iti). War around 1773.
76. Honga
77. Te Kena
78. Te Tite Anga Henua
79. Nga'ara (c. 1835 – just before 1860), son of King Kai Mako'i
80. Maurata (1859 – 1862)
81. Kai Mako'i 'Iti (= Small Kaimakoi) (– 1863), son of Nga'ara, devastation of island by Peruvian slavers in the great Peruvian slaving raid of 1862, died as a slave (in 1863?)
82. Tepito
83. Gregorio; i. e. Kerekorio Manu Rangi, Rokoroko He Tau
84. Atamu Tekena, signs Treaty of Annexation, Easter Island is annexed, died August 1892
85. Simeon Riro Kāinga, died in Valparaíso, Chile in 1899
86. Enrique Ika a Tuʻu Hati (1900–1901), not recognized
87. Moisés Tuʻu Hereveri (1901–1902), not recognized.

Modern claimants
2011–2017: Valentino Riroroko Tuki, (crowned July, proclaimed 8 August 2011) grandson of Simeon Riro Kāinga.

See also

 Hotu Matu'a
 King Nga'ara
 Rapa Nui
 Rapa Nui mythology

References

Further reading

Rapanui monarchs
Rapa Nui mythology
History of Easter Island
1st-millennium establishments in Easter Island
States and territories disestablished in 1888
Oceanian kings